Michael Jäger may refer to:

 Michael Jäger (artist) (born 1956), German artist
 Michael Jäger (astronomer) (born 1958), Austrian amateur astronomer
 Michael D. Jager (born 1968), American politician from Iowa

See also
 Michael Jagger (disambiguation)